Robert Arthur O'Shaughnessy (February 2, 1921 – September 5, 1995) was an American professional basketball player. He played for the Syracuse Nationals in the National Basketball League during the 1947–48 season and averaged 4.0 points per game.

O'Shaughnessy's collegiate career at the University of Nevada, Reno was interrupted by serving for the United States Army Air Forces in World War II. He flew over 50 missions against the Imperial Japanese Army, primarily in the Philippines. Back at Nevada, he competed for the track, basketball, and baseball teams.

References

1921 births
1995 deaths
United States Army personnel of World War II
American men's basketball players
Basketball players from Sacramento, California
Track and field athletes from Sacramento, California
Basketball players from San Jose, California
Track and field athletes from San Jose, California
Guards (basketball)
Nevada Wolf Pack baseball players
Nevada Wolf Pack men's basketball players
Nevada Wolf Pack men's track and field athletes
Syracuse Nationals players